Comet Gale is a periodic comet in the Solar System discovered by Walter Frederick Gale (Sydney, Australia) on June 7, 1927.

The second apparition was calculated for 1938, but Gale failed to find it; however, it was recalculated by Leland E. Cunningham who later recovered it for that year.

The 1949 apparition was never detected, and due to unfavourable conditions ever since it has never been recovered and it remains a lost comet.

References

External links 
 34D at Kronk's Cometography
 34D at Kazuo Kinoshita's Comets
 34D at Seiichi Yoshida's Comet Catalog
 

Periodic comets
0034
034D
Lost comets
19270607